KWVI may refer to:

 The ICAO code for Watsonville Municipal Airport
 KWVI (FM), a radio station (88.9 FM) licensed to Waverly, Iowa, United States